Parasegetibacter luojiensis is a Gram-negative, strictly aerobic, non-spore-forming, heterotrophic and motile  bacterium from the genus of Parasegetibacter which has been isolated from forest soil from the tree Populus euphratica from Xinjiang in China.

References

External links
Type strain of Parasegetibacter luojiensis at BacDive -  the Bacterial Diversity Metadatabase

Sphingobacteriia
Bacteria described in 2009